The Myanmar national badminton team represents Myanmar in international badminton team competitions. The best result for both men and women's team was a third place finish at the 1979 and 1995 Southeast Asian Games. The men's team was selected to take part in the 1976 Thomas Cup but failed to qualify into the first round.

History 
The Burmese national badminton team was formed in 1948 after the formation of Myanmar Badminton Federation. The team was sent to compete in the 1959 Southeast Asian Peninsular Games.

Men's team 
Myanmar have faced difficulties in qualifying for the Thomas Cup, having failed to qualify for the 1958 Thomas Cup after losing to Pakistan with a score of 8–1 in the qualifying tie and conceding a walkover to Hong Kong in the 1976 Thomas Cup Asian zone qualification round. Myanmar finished third at the Southeast Asian Games in 1971 and 1981. The men's team finished in third place for a third time at the 1995 Southeast Asian Games. Myanmar later took part in qualifying 1998 Thomas & Uber Cup. The team were drawn into Group C and won against Pakistan and Macau but lost to Canada. 

In 2018, the Burmese men's team made their debut at the Badminton Asia Team Championships, with a total of 6 players selected to represent the team. The team lost all their matches and were eliminated in the group stages.

Women's team 
The Burmese women's team enjoyed slight success in the late 70s, achieving third place at the 1979 WBF World Championships women's team event and winning third place in the 1979 Southeast Asian Games.

Mixed team 
The mixed team never qualified for the Sudirman Cup.

Competitive record

WBF World Championships

Women's team

Asian Team Championships 
Men's team

SEA Games

Men's team

Women's team

Mixed team

Junior competitive record

Asian Junior Team Championships

ASEAN School Games

Boys' team

Girls' team

Staff 
The following list shows the coaching staff for the Myanmar national badminton team.

Players

Current squad

Men's team

Women's team

References

Badminton
National badminton teams
Badminton in Myanmar